2009 Spanish regional elections may refer to:

2009 Basque regional election
2009 Galician regional election